Polacantha is a genus of robber flies in the family Asilidae. There are about 10 described species in Polacantha.

Species
These 10 species belong to the genus Polacantha:
 Polacantha arcuata Martin, 1975 i c g b
 Polacantha badia Martin, 1975 c g
 Polacantha brevis Martin, 1975 c g
 Polacantha composita (Hine, 1918) i c g b
 Polacantha gracilis (Wiedemann, 1828) i c g b
 Polacantha grossa Martin, 1975 i c g b
 Polacantha pegma Martin, 1975 i c g
 Polacantha petila Martin, 1975 c g
 Polacantha sinuosa Martin, 1975 i c g
 Polacantha tridens Martin, 1975 c g
Data sources: i = ITIS, c = Catalogue of Life, g = GBIF, b = Bugguide.net

References

Further reading

 
 
 

Asilidae
Articles created by Qbugbot
Asilidae genera